Bloodfist may refer to any of the following motion pictures:
 Bloodfist
 Bloodfist II
 Bloodfist III: Forced to Fight
 Bloodfist IV: Die Trying
 Bloodfist V: Human Target
 Bloodfist VI: Ground Zero
 Bloodfist VII: Manhunt
 Bloodfist VIII: Trained to Kill

English-language films
American martial arts films
Martial arts tournament films
Kickboxing films